The Tonotan Guns and Caves are a series of World War II-era military fortification on the island of Weno, the main island of Chuuk State in the Federated States of Micronesia.  They consist of an excavation housing an English naval gun, and a series of caves used for housing and operations that provided shelter from aerial bombardment.  The installations are located on the lower north flank of Mount Teroken, the island's highest peak.

The installations were listed on the United States National Register of Historic Places in 1976, when Chuuk was part of the US-administered Trust Territory of the Pacific Islands.

References

National Register of Historic Places in the Federated States of Micronesia
World War II sites in the Federated States of Micronesia
Weno